Dharma Chakkaram is a 1997 Tamil-language action drama film, directed by K. S. Ravikumar and produced by Lakshmi Movie Makers. The film stars Vijayakanth, Rambha and Deepti Bhatnagar. It was released on 14 January 1997.

Plot
Chakkaravarthy, chief of the village manages the problems that endures the villagers. His past is marked by Vijayalakshmi, that they were to marry each other. Arumugam, a jealous enemy of Chakkaravarthy, challenges. What Chakkaravarthy accepts as long as he gives something. Arumugam puts on a fight competition only if he loses Vijayalakshmi to him in marriage. Confident, she orders to win him against Arumugam. But Chakkaravarthy loses and Vijayalakshmi sacrifices her life after marrying Arumugam.

Entering the village Vijayalakshmi who has the same name as the old one. Vijayalakshmi is rebellious and defended by Chakkaravarthy when confronted by the villagers. When she is tortured by Arumugam's goons, Chakkaravarthy comes to her rescue.

Cast

 Vijayakanth as Chakkaravarthy
 Rambha as Vijayalakshmi
 Deepti Bhatnagar as Vijayalakshmi, Chakkaravarthy's former fiancée
 Manivannan as Vellasamy
 Senthil as Palani
 R. Sundarrajan as Kanakku Pillai
 B. H. Tharun Kumar as Arumugam
 Ponnambalam as K. Singamuthu
 C. R. Vijayakumari as Vijayalakshmi's adoptive mother
 Pandu as Chakkaravarthy's servant
 Vani as Vellasamy's wife
 Jyothi Lakshmi as Amsa Valli
 Delhi Ganesh as Vijayalakshmi's father, Chakkaravarthy's relative
 K. R. Vatsala as Kannukku Pillai's wife
 Ramesh Khanna as himself
 Crane Manohar as Broker
 K. S. Ravikumar in a cameo appearance
 Robo Shankar (uncredited)

Production
Suvaluxmi had turned down the lead female role before Deepti Bhatnagar was selected.

Soundtrack

The film score and the soundtrack were composed by Deva and lyrics by noted director R. V. Udayakumar.

References

1997 films
Films scored by Deva (composer)
Films directed by K. S. Ravikumar
1990s Tamil-language films